Maurice Lafont (September 13, 1927 – April 8, 2005) was a French football defender. He was part of the France national team during the 1958 FIFA World Cup tournament.

Honours
1958 FIFA World Cup third place with France

External links
 Player statistics at the French Football Federation's official web site

1927 births
2005 deaths
French footballers
France international footballers
Association football defenders
1958 FIFA World Cup players
Nîmes Olympique players
Grenoble Foot 38 players
SC Toulon players
Montpellier HSC players
French football managers
LB Châteauroux managers
AS Cherbourg Football managers